Tifayifu is an edict policy which took place in the Qing dynasty in 1645 when Han Chinese people (more specifically adult living men, who did not fall in the stipulated exceptions) were forced to follow Manchu hairstyle and Manchu clothing. In 1644, on the first day when the Manchu penetrated the Great Wall of China through the Shanhai pass, the Manchu rulers ordered the surrendering Han Chinese population to shave their heads; however, this policy came to a halt just a month later due to the intense resistance from the Han Chinese near Beijing. It is only after the Manchu recaptured Nanjing, the southern capital, in 1645 that the policy resumed and was enforced severely. Within one year after entering China proper, the Qing rulers demanded that men among their defeated subjects had to adopt Manchu hairstyle or face execution. Qing Manchu prince Dorgon initially canceled the order for all men in Ming territories south of the Great wall (post 1644 additions to the Qing) to shave. It was a Han official from Shandong, Sun Zhixie and Li Ruolin who voluntarily shaved their foreheads and demanded Qing Prince Dorgon impose the queue hairstyle on the entire population which led to the queue order.

The law was strongly opposed by the Han Chinese, especially those who were part of the late Ming scholars and literati class. Even 10 years after the tifayifu edict implementation, resistance to the hair cutting and changing clothing to Manchu style still occurred. In the Kangxi period, a large number of ordinary people still followed the clothing and hairstyle of the Ming dynasty, except for the officials and military generals who had to wear the Manchu queue and uniforms. With time, Han Chinese men eventually voluntarily adopted Manchu-style clothing, such as changshan and magua, over time, and by the late Qing, officials, scholars, and many commoners wore Manchu-style clothing.

Cultural significance

Hairstyle 
Wearing the queue (bianzi) was traditionally a Manchurian hairstyle, which was itself a variant of northern tribes' hairstyle, including the Jurchen. It differed from the way Han Chinese styled their hair; the Han Chinese kept long hair with all their hair grown over their head and was coiled into a topknot, held into place by Chinese headwear. Wearing the queue was unpopular among the Chinese and was met with resistance as shaving the head was against the "system of rites and music" of ancient China and violated the Confucian beliefs of not harming the body which was bestowed by one's parents as indicated in the Xiaojing, "Our bodies - to every hair and bit of skin - are received by us from our parents, and we must not presume to injure or wound them. This is the beginning of filial piety". Moreover, the traditional hairstyle of the Han Chinese were a fundamental aspect of their cultural identity and shaving their head was one of the greatest insults and was also a form punishment. The Qing rulers however perceived the queue as a visible of symbol of submission, refusing to withdraw or modify the regulation. The Manchu, Mongol bannermen and Han bannermen in Later Jin (1616–1636) territories since 1616 already shaved their foreheads. 

The Qing imposed the shaved head hairstyle on men of all ethnicities under its rule even before 1644 like upon the Nanai people in the 1630s who had to shave their foreheads. The men of certain ethnicities who came under Qing rule later like Salar people and Uyghur people already shaved all their heads bald so the shaving order was redundant.

However, the shaving policy was not enforced in the Tusi autonomous chiefdoms in Southwestern China where many minorities lived. There was one Han Chinese Tusi, the Chiefdom of Kokang populated by Han Kokang people.

Clothing 

Throughout China's multicultural history, clothing has been shaped through an intermingling of Han clothing styles, the Han Chinese being the dominant ethnicity, and the styles of various ethnic groups. Some examples include the standing collar of the cheongsam, which has been found in relics from the Ming dynasty, ruled by the Han Chinese, and was subsequently adopted in the Qing dynasty as Manchu clothing items. Manchu robes were initially collarless. The Manchu also adopted the right closure from the Han Chinese as they initially closed their robes on the left side.

Differences between Manchu and Han Chinese clothing 

Manchu and Han Chinese clothing (Hanfu, including those worn in the Ming dynasty) differed from each other, the broad and general description of such differences in how Ming dynasty clothing is typically associated with sedentary characteristics such as being loose, "ample, flowing robes" with wide and long-sleeves which restricted movement and with "slippers with upturned toes" while the Manchu clothing were "boots, trousers and functional riding coats of coat of nomadic horsemen" allowing physical mobility. Manchu coats were close fitting and had slashed openings on the four sides which allowed greater ease of movements when horse-riding; the sleeves were long and tight ending in horse-hoof shape which were designed to protects the hands from the wind; trousers were worn by both Manchu men and women, and their boots had rigid soles which facilitated mounted archery. For the Han Chinese, however, Manchu-style clothing conflicted with their Confucian prescriptions which govern their attire.

Manchu's refusal to adopt Chinese clothing 
Manchu clothing were associated with martial vigour. When Hong Taiji drew up the dressing code after 1636, he made a direct association between the decline of the Liao, Jin and Yuan dynasties (all non-Han Chinese regimes) with the adoption of Hanfu and the adoption of a sedentary lifestyle. Hong Taijji therefore reminded the Banner princes and Manchu officials (in 1635 and in 1637) that the conquests by the Manchu were through riding and archery, and thus the wide and brood-sleeved clothing of the Ming dynasty were entirely unsuitable to the Manchu lifestyle and worried that his descendant would adopt Han Chinese customs while forgetting the sources of their greatness; therefore, the Manchu strongly rejected the adoption of Ming dynasty court clothing. It is recorded that Hong Taiji said in 1636:

Hong Taiji was again cited by the Emperor Qianlong when urging his descendants to maintain the wearing of Manchu dress.

Symbol of submission 
Along with the adoption of the queue, the abandonment of traditional Hanfu through the adoption of Manchu clothing was also perceived as a symbol of submission by the Manchu. However, the early Qing court did not allow Han Chinese men to wear all forms of Manchu items as they prohibited Chinese men from wearing certain specific Manchu items, such as clothing made of fur.

Women's fashion ban 
The early Qing court also forbid Manchu women from dressing themselves in Han Chinese women's fashion, which included the wearing of Ming-style clothing with wide sleeves and from foot-binding (in 1638 by Hong Taiji for the Manchu women, in 1645 by Emperor Shunzhi and in 1662 and 1664 for both Han Chinese and Manchu; the ban on foot-binding for Han Chinese was eventually abandoned). Manchu women were also forbidden wearing a single earring (a Han Chinese custom) and had to wear three earrings in one ear instead (Manchu custom). 

However, from the middle of the 18th century, the women dress code were being infringed as it is recorded that Emperor Qianlong stated that "there were girls who emulated Han Chinese clothing and jewelry. This is truly not the Manchu custom" when he inspected the marriage draft. The dress code continued to be infringed as recorded in 1775 (when bondservant daughters were observed wearing one earring instead of 3 in one ear), in 1804 (when 19 girls came up with bound feet), in 1839 (when an imperial edict was decreed punishing fathers of young girls who presented themselves for imperial inspection wearing Chinese-style upper garment with wide sleeves).

Therefore, although Manchu clothing was prevalent and Hanfu was forbidden in daily life, Hanfu-style clothing did not cease existing in society.

Tifayifu Exemptions 

This policy was proposed by Jin Zijun (金之俊), a Han Chinese official of the Ming dynasty who surrendered to Qing dynasty, wherein the specifics of those exemptions were made with ten paired of lines:

Therefore, the tifayifu policy mainly applied to adult men, and the people who were generally exempted from the tifayifu policy were: Han Chinese women, Han Chinese children, Buddhist and, Taoist monks, deceased Han Chinese men, and performers in Chinese theatres, While the qizhuang was used in dominant spaces (e.g. ritual and official locations), Hanfu continued to be used in subordinate spaces (in theatre and women's quarters).

Consequences of tifayifu edict

Executions and progressive adoption of Manchu-style clothing by men 
Voicing disapproval to the queue order and urging to the return of Chinese fashion (Ming-style) lead to the execution of Chen Mingxia (a former Ming dynasty official) for treason in 1654 by the Shunzi emperor; Chen Mingxia suggested that the Qing dynasty court should adopt Ming-style clothing "in order to bring peace to the empire". It also lead to the execution of Liu Zhenyu during the Qianlong era for urging the clothing to be changed to what is presumed to Ming-style fashion; however, during this period, only the scholar-official elite were required to wear Manchu style and not the entire male population, so the great majority of men were allowed to dressed in Ming-style fashion. Han Chinese men eventually voluntarily adopted Manchu-style clothing, such as changshan and magua, over time, and by the late Qing, officials, scholars, and many commoners wore Manchu-style clothing.

Resistance and massacres 
The Tifayifu policy lead to outrage and resistance, especially in central and south China, when the unpopular policy united educated men and peasants together in resistance. In 1645, during military campaigns in south China, the Manchu troops were ordered to kill any Chinese who refused to shave his head. The Tifayifu policy lead to great bloodshed and resentment among the Chinese. 

It also led to resentment amongst the Han Chinese and also out of loyalty for the Ming dynasty, some areas in China fought back against the Manchu which provoked the Qing dynasty forced to massacre entire populations. There was accounts of such massacres perpetuated by Qing soldiers at southern cities, such as Jiading, and Jiangyin, where tens of thousands of people were deliberately and brutally killed. It was Han Chinese defectors who carried out massacres against people refusing to wear the queue. 

Li Chengdong, a Han Chinese general who had served the Ming but defected to the Qing, ordered troops to carry out three separate massacres in the city of Jiading within a month, resulting in tens of thousands of deaths. The three massacres at Jiading District are some of the most infamous. 

In June 1645, news that men were required to adopt Manchu hairstyle reached the city of Jiangyin. The city of Jiangyin held out against about 10,000 Qing troops for 83 days; when the city wall was finally breached on October 9, 1645, the Qing army, led by the Han Chinese Ming defector, General Liu Liangzuo, who had been ordered to "fill the city with corpses before you sheathe your swords," massacred the entire population, killing between 74,000 and 100,000 people. Although General Liu proclaimed that only adult men were to be executed, Liu's soldiers indiscriminately incinerated women and children in their houses. Of the initial population estimated to be about 100,000, there were only 53 reported survivors following the Jiayin massacre.

Han Chinese soldiers in 1645 under Han General Hong Chengchou forced the queue on the people of Jiangnan while Han people were initially paid silver to wear the queue in Fuzhou when it was first implemented.

See also 

 Hanfu movement
 Cheongsam
 Ruqun

References 

Legal history of China
Qing clothing
Chinese fashion
Chinese headgear